East Sandwich station is a former train station located in East Sandwich, Massachusetts. 

The station was built by the Cape Cod Branch Railroad when the line was extended beyond Sandwich. The station building still exists as a private residence at 404 Old Kings Highway (Massachusetts 6A), although it is much changed from its original appearance. It was moved back from the tracks, rotated almost 90 degrees, and had several additions made.

References

Sandwich, Massachusetts
Old Colony Railroad Stations on Cape Cod
Stations along Old Colony Railroad lines
Former railway stations in Massachusetts